Dedigama Dewage Lilian Leticia Rajapakse was a Ceylonese social worker. She was elected Member of Parliament from the Dodangaslanda Electoral District in a by election on 15 January 1967 from the Sri Lanka Freedom Party. She succeeded the seat made vacant by the death of her husband R. R. W. Rajapakse. She served until 1970 when the parliament was dissolved for fresh elections.

References

Sri Lankan social workers
Sinhalese politicians
Members of the 6th Parliament of Ceylon
Women legislators in Sri Lanka
People from Western Province, Sri Lanka
Sri Lanka Freedom Party politicians
Year of birth missing